MINUIT, now MINUIT2, is a numerical minimization software library originally written in the FORTRAN programming language by CERN staff physicist Fred James in the 1970s. It provides several minimization algorithms that search for parameter values that minimize a user-defined function. In addition to that it can compute confidence intervals for the parameters by scanning the function around the minimum.

Five minimization algorithms are available. The recommended default algorithm MIGRAD is described as 
"a variable-metric method with inexact line search, a stable metric updating scheme, and checks for positive-definiteness". 

The original FORTRAN code was later ported to C++ by the ROOT project; both the FORTRAN and C++ versions are in use . The program is very widely used in particle physics, and thousands of published papers cite use of MINUIT. In the early 2000s, Fred James started a project to implement MINUIT in C++ using object-oriented programming. The new MINUIT is an optional package (minuit2) in the ROOT release.  the latest version is 5.34.14, released on 24 January 2014. A Java port was developed, and a Python frontend to the C++ code is available.

References

External links
 F. James and M. Roos, Minuit: A System for Function Minimization and Analysis of the Parameter Errors and Correlations, Comput.Phys.Commun. 10 (1975) 343-367

Fortran software
Numerical software